Thyone aurea is a species of echinoderm belonging to the family Phyllophoridae.

The species is found in Southern Africa.

References

Phyllophoridae